Bungi may refer to:
 Bungi creole, a 19th-century western Canadian creole English spoken in the Red River Colony
 Bunji, Pakistan, a town in the northern area of Pakistan
 Bungi, Indonesia, a district in Indonesia
 Bungi, a First Nations band in Ontario

See also
Bungee (disambiguation)